Buildbox is a no-code development platform focused on game creation without programming, coding or scripting. The core audience for the software is entrepreneurs, designers and other gaming enthusiast without prior game development or coding knowledge.

It was acquired by AppOnboard in June 2019.

Buildbox was founded by Trey Smith in August 2014  with the goal "to democratize game development and create a way for anyone to be able to create video games without having to code" It is a cross platform development tool that can be run on both Windows Operating System and OSX. Primarily used to create mobile apps, Buildbox exports finalized games to iOS, Android, Amazon Mobile Devices, Amazon TV, Mac, PC and Steam.

The main features of Buildbox are the image drop wheel, asset bar, option bar, collision editor, scene editor, monetization options and sliders that change the physics within the game. While using Buildbox, users also get access to over 20,000 game assets, sound effects and animations.

One of the main advantages of the app is the Creator Menu where person can create the skeleton of the game.  Then the user can change or edit the character or multiple characters from the character settings, edit or change environmental settings (gravity, friction) create multiple worlds and levels, create a coin system, power ups, checkpoints, change the user interface and buttons with Node Editor Menu, animate objects, create banner and video ads, export for different platforms with one click, store the source code and edit character and object components.

Buildbox 3 
Buildbox 3 officially launched in May 2019, with a number of new features, including an in-depth, step-by-step tutorial for beginners as well as 14 new smart assets and 40 new nodes along with the dozens already available in the library. The latest version of Buildbox is version 3.5.3 , which was released on 21 December 2022.

See also 

 Game engine
 List of game engines
 No-code development platform

References

External links 
 

Video game engines
Video game development software
IPhone video game engines